Makale can refer to:

 Makale, Indonesia, a town in Sulawesi, Indonesia
 Mek'ele, a town in Ethiopia
 Gaspar Makale, Tanzanian solar electricity pioneer